Ioannis Kolokotronis (1805–1868), or Gennaios Kolokotronis as he was nicknamed, was a Greek warrior of the Greek War of Independence, General and Prime Minister of Greece.

Biography 
He was born at Stemnitsa, Arcadia, but he grew up at Zakynthos.
He was a son of Theodoros Kolokotronis and his mother was Aikaterini Karousou. He acquired the nickname "Gennaios" (meaning "brave") during the Greek War of Independence in which he fought valiantly despite his youth. He took part at the siege of Tripolitsa, together with his father.

During the civil wars he sided with his father.

Kolokotronis served as the aide-de-camp of King Otto with the rank of Major General, and was appointed by Otto as his last Prime Minister at 1862.

He married the sister of Kitsos Tzavelas, Photini Tzavela and together they had 2 sons and 5 daughters.

He died on 23 May 1868.

1803 births
1868 deaths
19th-century prime ministers of Greece
Greek military leaders of the Greek War of Independence
People from Zakynthos
Prime Ministers of Greece
Hellenic Army major generals
Ministers of the Interior of Greece
Gennaios
Members of the Royal Phalanx